Mowlik may refer to:

 Mowlik (surname)
 Mowlik-e Olya, village in northwestern Iran

See also